Abdulellah Jerman  (born May 28, 1992) is a Saudi football player who plays as a winger .

References

1992 births
Living people
Saudi Arabian footballers
Al-Orobah FC players
Al-Qala Club players
Place of birth missing (living people)
Saudi First Division League players
Saudi Professional League players
Saudi Second Division players
Saudi Third Division players
Association football wingers